The New York Dragons were a professional arena football team based in the New York metropolitan area. The Dragons participated in the Arena Football League's (AFL) National Conference as a member of the Eastern Division. They played in New York until 2008, when the league folded. They played in the Eastern Division of the National Conference, and played their home games at Nassau Coliseum in Uniondale, New York. Their last coach was Weylan Harding.

History
The team was based in suburban Uniondale, New York at the Nassau Veterans Memorial Coliseum, former home to the New York Islanders of the National Hockey League. The team's mascot was Sparky the Dragon, who is also mascot for the New York Islanders.

Iowa Barnstormers (1995–2000)

The need for a more modern venue as well as the league's desire for a larger market led to the move to the New York City area, despite two failed past attempts in the region: the New York Knights and the New York CityHawks (–), both of which played at Madison Square Garden in Manhattan. The team was purchased by Charles Wang, who was also the Islanders' majority owner.

The Arena Football organization did award an af2 franchise to Iowa for the  season also called the Barnstormers, but that team folded after that season (only to be brought back in 2008). The Barnstormers were noted for their unique uniforms, which in keeping with the aviation theme included the depiction of goggles on the helmets, wings on the shoulders of the jerseys, and propellers on the pants legs. The primary figures in the original Iowa organization were Jim Foster, the inventor of Arena Football, and Kurt Warner, the quarterback who went on to play for the St. Louis Rams and win both the NFL MVP and Super Bowl XXXIV MVP.

Aside from the league's desire to re-enter the New York market, another major reason cited for the team's relocation was the inadequacy of their Des Moines venue, the Iowa Veterans Memorial Auditorium, also known as "The Barn". Most of the seats in this venue were located directly along the sidelines as is typical of high school sports venues. The Barnstormers organization constantly lobbied for the construction of a better facility during their time in Des Moines, to no avail.

In 2005, the Wells Fargo Arena opened in Des Moines, directly across from what the locals call "Vets", as part of the newly expanded Iowa Events Center. A new Barnstormers af2 franchise began play there in the  season.

New York Dragons (2001–2008)
On November 1, 2000, it was announced that the Iowa Barnstormers had relocated to New York as the Dragons.  The Dragons' logo and uniforms were designed by Chris Trevas who is a full-time Star Wars artist. Nassau Coliseum, where the franchise relocated, is generally regarded as one of the most marginal venues currently used in major American professional sports, and is often proposed for replacement, so the improvement of the situation with regards to a venue has been fairly minimal to this point. In late September 2004, Islanders' ownership announced an ambitious project to renovate the Coliseum, surrounding it with housing units and construction of an adjacent tower, resembling a lighthouse, at a total cost of over $200 million (US). Since then, the lighthouse has been taken out of the design plan.

The New York Dragons had competed in the Eastern Division of the National Conference.  They were coached by former Barnstormer defensive back Weylan Harding. In the 2006 season Weylan Harding became the winningest Arena Football league coach in his first two seasons as a coach, winning twenty games throughout the 2005 and  seasons.

The Dragons had one of the biggest stars in the Arena Football League, in quarterback Aaron Garcia. Garcia has the honor of most touchdown passes in a game (11), and second most touchdown passes in a season (104 in 2001). Through his 10-year career, he has thrown over 800 touchdown passes.

The Dragons set the league record for most points in a game, scoring 99 against the Carolina Cobras on July 7, 2001, surpassing the previous record of 91, which had been set by the New Jersey Red Dogs in 1997 against the Texas Terror. It also set a record for the most points scored in one game (167).

On Saturday, February 11, 2006, the Dragons won against the expansion team Utah Blaze 84–81 on the road and they made AFL history for the second-most points scored in one game with 165.

On July 8, 2008 a group of investors, led by Steve Silva, announced they are buying the team from Charles Wang. With the purchase the team would change its uniforms, logo, and colors. The team also announced that the Dragons will continue to play in the Nassau Coliseum despite rumors that the Dragons would move to Manhattan and play their games at Madison Square Garden.

On September 23, 2008, the Dragons announced their new logo and color scheme. The old colors of red and yellow were replaced by green and grey.

The Dragons official mascot was a dragon named Sparky, who is also the mascot of the NHL's New York Islanders.

On December 14, 2008, the Arena Football League announced it would cancel the 2009 season, but hoped to return in 2010.

On July 20, 2009, Sports Business Journal reported that the AFL owed approximately $14 million to its creditors and were considering filing for Chapter 11 bankruptcy protection. Owners were also exploring the expansion franchise in Pittsburgh in order to use the expansion fees to help pay off the debts and infuse enough cash into the league to hold the 2010 season.[19] In early August 2009, numerous media outlets began reporting that the AFL was folding permanently and would file for Chapter 7 bankruptcy. The league released a statement on August 4 announcing that while the league is not folding, it is suspending league operations indefinitely. Several teams commented that they were still pursuing arena football in 2010 with the possibility of using the financially independent arenafootball2.[2] Despite this, several of the league's creditors have filed papers to force a Chapter 7 liquidation if the league does not do so voluntarily.[20] This request was granted on August 7, though converted to a Chapter 11 reorganization on August 26.[21]

Less than two months after the announcement, and a few weeks after the suspension forced the dissolution of af2, the Arizona Rattlers and Orlando Predators defected to Arena Football 1, a startup league consisting mostly of former af2 teams. The 16-team league expects to expand to "24 to 30" teams prior to the start of their inaugural 2010 season, and is in negotiations with at least seven other teams from the AFL to join, including the Tampa Bay Storm and the San Jose Sabercats([22] and [23]). The New York Dragons are not to be part of AF1.

Historic moments
 On Saturday, July 7, 2001, in a Week 13 home game against the Carolina Cobras, QB Aaron Garcia has a prolific performance. He would throw a league-best 11 touchdown passes in the highest scoring game in league history. The Dragons would win the game 99–68. This is at #11 on the AFL's 20 Greatest Highlights Countdown.
 On June 2, 2007, Aaron Garcia became only the fourth man to ever record 800 touchdown passes. He joins the list with Clint Dolezel, Sherdrick Bonner, and Andy Kelly.
 On June 28, 2008, the Dragons, making the postseason even after finishing the season 8–8 (fourth in the National Eastern Division), went on to defeat the favored Dallas Desperados in the wild card round of the playoffs. Dallas finished second in the National Eastern Division with the record of 12–4, yet fell to an underdog New York team 77–63. They would go on to lose to the Philadelphia Soul in the following round, 49–48 on a last second touchdown pass that replays showed to be a questionable call.

Season-by-season

Coaches

Notable players

Individual awards

All-Arena players
The following Dragons players were named to All-Arena Teams:
QB Aaron Garcia (1)
FB/LB Rodney Filer (1)
WR/DB Mike Furrey (1)
OL/DL Robert Stewart (1)
DL Henry Taylor (1)
OS Kevin Swayne (1)
DB Billy Parker (1)
DS Billy Parker (1)

All-Ironman players
The following Dragons players were named to All-Ironman Teams:
 WR/DB Mike Furrey (1)
 WR/LB Mike Horacek (1)
 OL/DL Marcus Owen (1)
 WR/DB/KR Will Holder (1)

All-Rookie players
The following Dragons players were named to All-Rookie Teams:
 WR/DB Lincoln Dupree
 OL/DL Delbert Cowsette
 DL John Nix, Farouk Adelekan
 DB Levy Brown
 DS Billy Parker, Dahnel Singfield
WR/LB  Tierre Jones

NFL players/coaches
The following players coached or played in the NFL
QBKurt Warner
K Rob Bironas 
K Matt Bryant
WR Mike Furrey
QB Danny Kanell
WR Kevin Swayne
QB Matt Nagy (coach)

Notes

External links
 Iowa Barnstormers at ArenaFan
 New York Dragons at ArenaFan

 
American football teams in New York (state)
Defunct American football teams in New York (state)